Robert Lee "Bob" Peeler (born January 4, 1952) served as the 86th Lieutenant Governor of South Carolina from January 1995 to January 2003. He was the first Republican Lieutenant Governor of South Carolina since Richard Howell Gleaves served during the Reconstruction era.

Biography 
He currently serves on the Clemson University Board of Trustees. Peeler, a 1991 graduate of the school, was elected to the board in 2003. Peeler is currently a manager of Community and Municipal Relations for Waste Management Inc. in Lexington, South Carolina. His family runs a milk industry  in Gaffney, South Carolina, and his older brother, Harvey S. Peeler, Jr., is a state senator.

In 2002, Peeler had an unsuccessful run for Governor, having been beaten in the primary race runoff by Mark Sanford.

Peeler was educated at Limestone College.

References

1952 births
Living people
People from Gaffney, South Carolina
South Carolina Republicans
Lieutenant Governors of South Carolina
Limestone University alumni
Clemson University alumni